HiNT station, formally known as Røstad station, is a railway station located in the town of Levanger in the municipality of Levanger in Trøndelag county, Norway.  It is located on the Nordland Line. The station gets its name from being located just beside the Nord-Trøndelag University College campus at Røstad as well as the Norwegian Food Safety Authority.

The unstaffed station is served hourly by the Trøndelag Commuter Rail service to Steinkjer and Trondheim. The service is operated by SJ Norge.

History
The station was opened on 7 January 2001 after a new large section of HiNT had moved to Røstad and the Trøndelag Commuter Rail was reorganized.

References

Railway stations in Levanger
Railway stations on the Nordland Line
Railway stations opened in 2001
2001 establishments in Norway